The wreckfish are a family, Polyprionidae in the suborder Percoidei of the order Perciformes.

They are deep-water marine fish and can be found on the ocean bottom, where they inhabit caves and shipwrecks (thus their common name). Their scientific name is from Greek poly meaning "many" and prion meaning "saw", a reference to their prominent spiny fins.

Atlantic wreckfish (Polyprion americanus) are a long-lived commercial species in the Mediterranean, the south-eastern Pacific and the Atlantic Ocean.

Genere
There are four species in two genera:

 Genus Polyprion Oken, 1817
 Polyprion americanus (Bloch & Schneider, 1801)
 Polyprion oxygeneios (Schneider & Forster, 1801)
 Genus Stereolepis Ayres, 1859
 Stereolepis gigas Ayres, 1859
 Stereolepis doederleini Lindberg & Krasyukova, 1969

References

 
Percoidei